The Division of Burke was an Australian Electoral Division in Victoria. The division was named after Robert O'Hara Burke, an explorer who led the Victorian expedition in 1860, the first white explorer to cross Australia from south to north. The division was created in 1949 and replaced the similarly located and pronounced division of Bourke. It was located in the inner suburbs of Melbourne, including Brunswick and Fitzroy. It was a safe seat for the Australian Labor Party. It was abolished in 1955.

Members

Election results

See also
 Division of Burke (1969-2004)

References

Burke (1949-55)
Constituencies established in 1949
1949 establishments in Australia
Constituencies disestablished in 1955
1955 disestablishments in Australia